The Kirti Chakra is an Indian military decoration awarded for valour, courageous action or self-sacrifice away from the field of battle. It may be awarded to civilians as well as military personnel, including posthumous awards. It is the peacetime equivalent of the Maha Vir Chakra. It is second in order of precedence of peacetime gallantry awards, comes after Ashoka Chakra and before Shaurya Chakra. Before 1967, the award was known as the Ashoka Chakra, Class II.

History 

Established as the "Ashoka Chakra, Class II" by the President of India, 4 January 1952 (with effect from 15 August 1947). The statutes were revised and the decoration renamed on 27 January 1967.

To understand the award better, a sample recipient would be No. 18161 Naik Mukhtiar Singh, 4 J. & K. Infantry (to date from 19 March 1956)."On the night of 18/19 March 1956, the position occupied by our troops on the Bela at Hussainiwala Headworks, near Ferozepore on the Indo-Pakistani Border was attacked. Approximately one platoon of attackers managed to secure a foothold on the Bela from the left flank. On being ordered by his platoon commander to take his section to the threatened flank and stem the advance, No. 18161  Naik Mukhtiar Singh personally led his section through heavy automatic fire. He inflicted two casualties on the attackers, captured their rifles and led his section up to the right Guide Bund and secured his objective. Whilst his section was securing the objective on the Bund, a hand grenade landed near him in the midst of his section. To save his section, he lifted the grenade with his left hand and tried to throw it back on the attackers. The grenade exploded in the meantime and his left elbow was blown off. Though seriously wounded he continued to exhort his men to fight on and refused to be evacuated. No. 18161 Naik Mukhtiar Singh by his high example of personal leadership, courage and complete disregard for his personal safety averted a disaster to his section and to the Bela Position."

Design 
 Medal: It is circular in shape and is made of standard silver, one and three eight inches in diameter.
 Obverse: On the obverse of the medal shall be embossed a replica of Ashoka Chakra in the centre, surrounded by a lotus wreath.
 Reverse:On its reverse shall be embossed the words KIRTI CHAKRA both in Hindi and in English the versions being separated by two lotus flowers.For pre-1967 awards, the medal is blank in the centre, with "Ashoka Chakra" in Hindi along the upper edge on the medal and the same name in English along the lower rim, "ASHOKA CHAKRA". On either side is a lotus design. The centre is blank, perhaps with the intent that details of the award be engraved there. There is no indication of the class on the pre-1967 awards. For the post-1967 awards, the, names are changed to "Kirti Chakra" in Hindi above and "KIRTI CHAKRA" below.
 Ribbon: 30 mm, dark green with two 2 mm saffron stripes. Dark green 8.5 mm, saffron 2 mm, dark green 9 mm, saffron 2 mm, dark green 8.5 mm.
 Bar:If a recipient of the Chakra again performs such an act of gallantry as would have made him or her eligible to receive the Chakra, such further act of bravery shall be recognised by a Bar to be attached to the riband by which the Chakra is suspended. For every Bar awarded, a replica of the Chakra in miniature shall be added to the riband when worn alone.

Eligibility 

Personnel Eligible: The following categories of personnel shall be eligible for the Chakra :-
Officers, men and women of all ranks of the Army, the Navy and the Air Force, of any of the Reserve Forces, of the Territorial Army, Militia and of any other lawfully constituted Armed Forces.
Members of the Nursing Services of the Armed Forces.
Civilian citizens of either sex in all walks of life and members of Police Forces including Central Para-Military Forces and Railway Protection Force.

Conditions of Eligibility:  The medal is awarded for conspicuous gallantry otherwise than in the face of the enemy. The decoration may be awarded posthumously. Monetary Allowance. Rs. 1050/- pm and each bar to the decoration will carry the same amount of monetary allowance as admissible to the original award with effect from 01.02.1999.

Recipients

Trivia
 Captain (later Lieutenant General) Joginder Singh Gharaya and other 11 persons were first recipients of the Kirti Chakra.
 B.B.L. Datt was the first civilian recipient of the Kirti Chakra.
 Glori Berry, a flight attendant of Air India was the female recipient of the Kirti Chakra.
 Wing Commander Ravish Malhotra is the first astronaut to be awarded with the Kirti Chakra.
Only one Soldier, Colonel Neelakantan Jayachandran Nair has been awarded both the Kirti Chakra and the Ashok Chakra, making him the most decorated soldier (for bravery) in India.

Outline:
 Ashoka Chakra, Class II (1952–67)
 Kirti Chakra (1967--)

References

External links
 Kirti Chakra at Indian Army website
Kirtichakra Medal
 Bharat Rakshak Article on Kirti Chakra

Military awards and decorations of India
Kirti Chakra
Courage awards